This is a list of films which have placed number one at the weekend box office in the United Kingdom during 2015.

Films

1 Spectre's opening gross was for a 7-day period, not a weekend, as the film opened on a Monday.

References

2015
Unit
2015 in British cinema